The following is a list of awards and nominations received by American actress Glenn Close. Among her numerous accolades for acting, Close is a three-time Primetime Emmy Award winner, three-time Tony Award winner, and three-time Golden Globe Award winner. Additionally, she has been nominated eight times for an Academy Award, holding the record for the most Oscar nominations in an acting category without a win (tied with Peter O'Toole), making her one of the five most-nominated actresses in Academy history. She has also earned two additional Primetime Emmy Award nominations as an executive producer and an additional Golden Globe Award nomination for her work as a songwriter.

Film and television

Academy Awards
 0 wins out of 8 nominations
The Academy Awards (Oscars) are presented by the Academy of Motion Picture Arts and Sciences (AMPAS).

British Academy Film Awards
 0 wins out of 2 nominations
The British Academy Film Awards (BAFTAs) are presented by the British Academy of Film and Television Arts.

Golden Globe Awards
 3 wins out of 16 nominations
The Golden Globe Awards are presented by the Hollywood Foreign Press Association (HFPA).

Primetime Emmy Awards
 3 wins out of 14 nominations
The Primetime Emmy Awards are presented by the American Academy of Television Arts & Sciences.

Satellite Awards
 2 wins out of 7 nominations

Screen Actors Guild Awards
 2 win out of 10 nominations
The Screen Actors Guild Awards (SAG Awards) are presented by the Screen Actors Guild-American Federation of Television and Radio Arts (SAG-AFTRA).

Other awards

Theatre

Drama Desk Awards

Evening Standard Awards

Laurence Olivier Awards
The Laurence Olivier Award is presented annually by the Society of London Theatre (SLT) to recognize excellence in professional theater. Named after the renowned British actor Laurence Olivier, the awards are a UK equivalent of Broadway's Tony Awards.

Obie Awards

Tony Awards
The Antoinette Perry Award (Tony) is presented by the American Theatre Wing and The Broadway League. Considered the highest honor in US theatre, they are the theatre equivalent to the Oscars (film) and the Emmys (television).

Music awards

Grammy Awards
The Grammy Awards are presented by the American National Academy of Recording Arts and Sciences.

Honorary awards

Notes

References

External links
 Official Golden Globes website
 Oscar.org (official Academy Award site)
 The Academy Awards Database (official site)

Close, Glenn